Antonín Fantiš (born 15 April 1992) is a professional Czech football player currently plays for Trinity Zlín.

Fantiš has played international football at under-21 level for Czech Republic U21.

References

External links
 
 
 
 

1992 births
Living people
Czech footballers
Czech Republic youth international footballers
Czech Republic under-21 international footballers
Czech First League players
Czech National Football League players
FC Baník Ostrava players
1. FK Příbram players
FK Jablonec players
FC Fastav Zlín players
Association football forwards
Association football wingers
Footballers from Prague